Tegostoma uniforma is a moth in the family Crambidae. It was described by Hans Georg Amsel in 1951 and is found in Afghanistan.

References

Odontiini
Moths described in 1951
Moths of Asia
Taxa named by Hans Georg Amsel